The Guayaquil Ecuador Temple is the 58th operating temple of the Church of Jesus Christ of Latter-day Saints (LDS Church).

History
In 1982, Spencer W. Kimball, then president of the LDS Church, announced that there would be an LDS temple built in Ecuador. It took fourteen years to secure the necessary government authorizations and the temple was not completed and dedicated until 1999. The temple was built with Brazilian granite at a cost of US$14,456,000. It is topped by a statue of Moroni.

Before the temple in Ecuador was finished, church members in Ecuador would travel three days by bus to attend the temple in Lima, Peru. Before the LDS temple was dedicated, an open house was free to all in the community, including government officials. Over one hundred thousand members and non-members participated in the open house.

The Guayaquil Ecuador Temple was dedicated on August 1, 1999, by LDS Church president Gordon B. Hinckley.

The temple resides on a hill in Urdesa, a peaceful suburb of northern Guayaquil, Ecuador's main port and most populous city.

Lynn Shawcroft of Arizona was the first president to oversee the operations of the temple, serving from July 1999 to November 2002.

In 2020, the Guayaquil Ecuador Temple was closed temporarily during the year in response to the coronavirus pandemic.

See also

 Jorge A. Rojas, former temple president
 Comparison of temples of The Church of Jesus Christ of Latter-day Saints
 List of temples of The Church of Jesus Christ of Latter-day Saints
 List of temples of The Church of Jesus Christ of Latter-day Saints by geographic region
 Temple architecture (Latter-day Saints)
 The Church of Jesus Christ of Latter-day Saints in Ecuador

References

Additional reading

External links
 
Guayaquil Ecuador Temple Official site
Guayaquil Ecuador Temple at ChurchofJesusChristTemples.org

20th-century Latter Day Saint temples
Buildings and structures in Guayaquil
Temples (LDS Church) completed in 1999
Temples (LDS Church) in South America
Religious buildings and structures in Ecuador
The Church of Jesus Christ of Latter-day Saints in Ecuador
1999 establishments in Ecuador